Hill House International Junior School is an independent preparatory day school primarily in the Knightsbridge district of London. It was founded in September 1949 by athlete and Liberal Party politician Lt-Col Stuart Townend with his wife, Beatrice, initially in Switzerland, but has since also established branches in South West London. It is the largest preparatory school in London and was originally a boys-exclusive school, turning fully coeducational in 1981. The school is known for its distinct uniform, which includes thick mustard cable-knit jumpers, rust corduroy knickerbockers, knitted hats, and bags in British racing green.

History
The school was founded in Switzerland in 1949 and in London in 1951 by Lieutenant-Colonel Townend and his wife, Beatrice. Townend chose his pupils solely on the basis of his approval of their mothers, and women teachers were preferentially chosen according to the height of their skirt's hemline. His son, Richard Townend, is the school's current Headmaster. The school remains a family concern.

Prince Charles went to Hill House, following advice from Harold Macmillan, Prime Minister at the time. It was his first school and was the first time that an heir to the British throne had been to a civilian school, as princes were educated either by tutors or at a military or naval academy such as Osborne.

As of 2018 there are 690 pupils at the school from the ages of 4 to 13.

Media coverage

The school was featured in the 1989 documentary episode "Knickerbockers in Knightsbridge", part of the ninth season of the BBC series 40 Minutes, in which school life under Headmaster Stuart "The Colonel" Townend is narrated.

The school was outlined on page 74, chapter 3.1 ("Learning to be Sloane: Sloane Education"), of Peter York's and Ann Barr's 1982 guide book The Official Sloane Ranger Handbook as an appropriate calibre of school on the "third rung of the ladder" of a "Sloane boy's" education: describing it, amongst other things, as "Prince Charles's old school. Outdoorsy, musical, for energetic extroverts."

Notable alumni

Lily Allen, singer-songwriter
Charles III, King of the United Kingdom and 14 other Commonwealth realms
Rupert Degas, actor
Sofia Ellar, singer-songwriter
Ian Macpherson, 3rd Baron Strathcarron, Conservative Peer 
Yasmine Naghdi, Principal ballerina of The Royal Ballet, The Royal Opera House, Covent Garden, London
Jacob Rees-Mogg, Conservative Member of Parliament (MP), former Leader of the House of Commons
Anya Taylor-Joy, actress
Nick Watt, BBC Newsnight political editor
Mark-Francis Vandelli, television personality most known for his role in Made in Chelsea

See also
List of schools in the Royal Borough of Kensington and Chelsea

References

External links

 School website

1951 establishments in England
Educational institutions established in 1951
Private co-educational schools in London
Private schools in the Royal Borough of Kensington and Chelsea
Knightsbridge
Preparatory schools in London